Markus Gerardus Jozef "Mark" Harbers (born 19 April 1969) is a Dutch politician who serves as the Minister of Infrastructure and Water Management in the Fourth Rutte cabinet since 10 January 2022. He previously served the State Secretary for Justice and Security in the Third Rutte cabinet from 26 October 2017 until 21 May 2019. He is a member of the People's Party for Freedom and Democracy (VVD).

Early life and education
Harbers was born in Ede, Gelderland. He studied economics at Erasmus University Rotterdam but dropped out before graduation.

Political career

Career in local politics
A former communication employee, Harbers served as a member of the district council of Kralingen-Crooswijk from 1992 to 1998 and municipal councillor of Rotterdam from 2002 until 2007. He was an alderman from 2007 to 2009, in charge of Economic Affairs, the Port of Rotterdam and the Environment.

Career in national politics
During the 2006 general election, Harbers occupied the 26th place on the list of VVD candidates; the party obtained 22 seats. On 1 December 2009, he entered the House of Representatives following the resignation of Arend Jan Boekestijn. He was reelected in 2010, 2012 and 2017.

On 26 October 2017, Harbers resigned from the House of Representatives to become State Secretary at the Ministry of Justice and Security, dealing with Asylum and Migration Affairs under the supervision of Minister Ferdinand Grapperhaus.

Effective 21 May 2019, Harbers resigned from his position following the publication of a report minimising the crimes committed by asylum seekers in the Netherlands. He was replaced by Senate President Ankie Broekers-Knol and returned to the House of Representatives shortly thereafter.

Minister of Infrastructure and Water Management, 2022–present
Early in his tenure, Harbers closed the Netherlands' airspace to Russian aircraft in response to the 2022 Russian invasion of Ukraine.

References 

  Parlement.com biography

External links 

  Mark Harbers
  House of Representatives biography
  People's Party for Freedom and Democracy biography

1969 births
Living people
21st-century Dutch politicians
Aldermen of Rotterdam
Dutch political consultants
Dutch speechwriters
Gay politicians
Dutch LGBT businesspeople
LGBT cabinet members of the Netherlands
LGBT conservatism
LGBT members of the Parliament of the Netherlands
Members of the House of Representatives (Netherlands)
Ministers of Infrastructure of the Netherlands
Ministers of Water Management of the Netherlands
Municipal councillors of Rotterdam
People from Ede, Netherlands
People's Party for Freedom and Democracy politicians
State Secretaries for Justice of the Netherlands
Vice Chairmen of the People's Party for Freedom and Democracy
20th-century Dutch people